{{DISPLAYTITLE:D7 polytope}}

In 7-dimensional geometry, there are 95 uniform polytopes with D7 symmetry; 32 are unique, and 63 are shared with the B7 symmetry. There are two regular forms, the 7-orthoplex, and 7-demicube with 14 and 64 vertices respectively.

They can be visualized as symmetric orthographic projections in Coxeter planes of the D6 Coxeter group, and other subgroups.


Graphs 

Symmetric orthographic projections of these 32 polytopes can be made in the D7, D6, D5, D4, D3, A5, A3, Coxeter planes. Ak has [k+1] symmetry, Dk has [2(k-1)] symmetry. B7 is also included although only half of its [14] symmetry exists in these polytopes.

These 32 polytopes are each shown in these 8 symmetry planes, with vertices and edges drawn, and vertices colored by the number of overlapping vertices in each projective position.

References
 H.S.M. Coxeter:
 H.S.M. Coxeter, Regular Polytopes, 3rd Edition, Dover New York, 1973
 Kaleidoscopes: Selected Writings of H.S.M. Coxeter, edited by F. Arthur Sherk, Peter McMullen, Anthony C. Thompson, Asia Ivic Weiss, Wiley-Interscience Publication, 1995,  
 (Paper 22) H.S.M. Coxeter, Regular and Semi Regular Polytopes I, [Math. Zeit. 46 (1940) 380-407, MR 2,10]
 (Paper 23) H.S.M. Coxeter, Regular and Semi-Regular Polytopes II, [Math. Zeit. 188 (1985) 559-591]
 (Paper 24) H.S.M. Coxeter, Regular and Semi-Regular Polytopes III, [Math. Zeit. 200 (1988) 3-45]
 N.W. Johnson: The Theory of Uniform Polytopes and Honeycombs, Ph.D. Dissertation, University of Toronto, 1966

Notes

7-polytopes